Jussim is a surname. Notable people with the surname include:

 Jared Jussim (born 1935), American lawyer
 Lee Jussim (born 1955), American social psychologist

Portuguese-language surnames